The 1997 Samsonite 200 (also referred to as the Colorado 200 on ABC's TV coverage) was the seventh round of the 1996–1997 Indy Racing League. The race was held on June 29, 1997, at the  Pikes Peak International Raceway in Fountain, Colorado.

Qualifying

  Couldn't qualify after his chassis had been damaged in a practice crash. He was allowed to start the race at the back of the field.

Failed to qualify or withdrew
 Jim Guthrie R for Blueprint Racing - crashed during Friday's first practice session and was hospitalised with a fractured vertebra.
 Robbie Buhl for Team Menard - suffered a concussion during testing on June 13 and was unable to compete.
 Mike Groff for Byrd-Cunningham Racing - entered for the race, but not cleared to drive because of the injuries suffered at Texas. Replaced by  Johnny Unser
 John Paul Jr. for PDM Racing - entered for the race, but not cleared to drive because of the injuries suffered at Indianapolis. Replaced by  Billy Boat R
 Alessandro Zampedri for Team Scandia - Although not officially withdrawn for the weekend, he didn't appear at the track, as Team Scandia downgraded its operation from five to three cars following an engine shortage at Texas and a reshuffle of the team's lineup,

Race Recap

Tony Stewart came into this race having just missed victory in the past three IRL races, but he put the issue beyond doubt by dominating this race, leading all but seven of the 200 laps. The race started off with polesitter Scott Sharp wrecking on the first lap. He suffered a non-contact brain injury, despite relatively minor damage to the car. The accident (following a similar accident 2 weeks before which forced Stewart's teammate Robbie Buhl to miss the race) revived concern about the cars' inability to absorb energy in a rear-end accident, leading to changes in the gearbox case and bellhousing. Sharp would miss the rest of the season as the result of the injury. Turns 2 and 4 were treacherous all day, and several early crashes resulted in lengthy cleanups and many laps under caution.

Eddie Cheever dogged Stewart all day long, and Stéphan Grégoire led his first-ever laps in an IRL race. In the end neither of them had enough for Stewart, but after a late caution Cheever, Davey Hamilton, and Grégoire dueled three-wide for second. Grégoire broke out and attempted to slingshot Stewart at the finish line, missing by about a car length. Cheever and Hamilton finished side-by-side with Hamilton taking third. The win was Stewart's first in his Indy car career, and the first win for team owner John Menard Jr. after 18 years of Indy car competition. Seven cars finished the race on the lead lap, an IRL record.

Box Score

Race Statistics
Lead changes: 5 among 4 drivers

Standings after the race
Drivers' Championship standings

 Note: Only the top five positions are included for the standings.

References

External links
IndyCar official website

1996–97 in IndyCar
Samsonite 200
Motorsport in Colorado